Dilmurad railway station is located in Pakistan.

See also
 Pakistan Railways

References

Railway stations in Jacobabad District
Railway stations on Kotri–Attock Railway Line (ML 2)